Geoffrey Paul Regan  (born 22 November 1959) is a former Canadian politician who served as the 36th Speaker of the House of Commons of Canada from 2015 to 2019. A member of the Liberal Party of Canada, he was the Member of Parliament (MP) for Halifax West 2000 to 2021, previously holding the seat from 1993 to 1997. Under Paul Martin, he was Minister of Fisheries and Oceans from 2003 to 2006.

Early life and career
Regan was born in Windsor, Nova Scotia. Regan is the son of Gerald Regan, a former Premier of Nova Scotia and Cabinet Minister under Pierre Trudeau, and Carole Harrison, the daughter of John Harrison, a Member of Parliament from Saskatchewan. Two of his sisters  are also well-known: Nancy Regan was a well-known local television personality with ATV, Laura Regan is an actress.

Regan graduated from Sackville High School in 1977 and then earned his Bachelor of Arts in Political Science from St. Francis Xavier University in 1980. Following university, Regan went on to earn a law degree from Dalhousie University, graduating in 1983. He was admitted to the Nova Scotia Barristers’ Society in 1984 and practiced real estate and commercial law before entering public life.

Regan was a member of Toastmasters for almost ten years, in the late 1980s to early 1990s.

Federal politics
Regan was first elected to the House of Commons as part of the Liberal landslide victory in the 1993 federal election under Jean Chrétien. He was defeated in the 1997 election by NDP candidate Gordon Earle, mainly because of the federal government's changes to employment insurance.

After regaining his seat in the 2000 federal election, Regan was appointed Parliamentary Secretary to the Leader of the Government in the House of Commons, a position then held by Don Boudria. In 2003, Paul Martin appointed him as Minister of Fisheries and Oceans.

Regan was the Regional Minister for Nova Scotia in the newly formed government of Paul Martin, sworn in on 12 December 2003. Regan was re-elected in the 2004 federal election. He would keep position in cabinet in Martin’s minority government. In February 2004, Regan was appointed to act as Minister of Justice and Attorney General of Canada, in matters related to Maher Arar.

In opposition 

Upon the defeat of the Liberal government in the 2006 election, he was appointed by Bill Graham, Interim Leader of the Official Opposition, to the shadow cabinet as the Official Opposition Critic for Human Resources and Skills Development. During his time as critic, Regan introduced a private members’ bill to expand Canada Access Grants for disabled and low income students. In January 2007, he was appointed to the newly created Liberal Priorities and Planning Committee, which was chaired by then Liberal Opposition Leader Stéphane Dion. In March 2008, Regan was named Chair of the Caucus Committee on Environmental Sustainability. Regan also served as Vice-Chair of the House of Commons Standing Committee on Environment and Sustainable Development.

Regan was re-elected in 2008, and 2011 federal elections, despite significant Liberal losses in both. Regan won his seat by a few percentage points in the latter election as the Liberals finished in third place. Under the leadership of Stephane Dion, Regan served as Opposition Critic for Human Resources and Skills Development. Under Michael Ignatieff, Regan served as Liberal Critic for Natural Resources, and later, Public Works and Government Services and also as the Liberal Natural Resources Critic under leader Justin Trudeau and the  Vice-Chair of the Standing Committee on Natural Resources.

Speaker of the House of Commons 

Regan was re-elected in the 2015 federal election with 68% of the vote as the Liberal party swept all 32 Atlantic Canada seats and formed a majority government. On 2 December 2015, Regan was selected as Speaker of the House of Commons in secret ballot by members of the 42nd Parliament over Liberals Denis Paradis and Yasmin Ratansi and Conservative Bruce Stanton. Regan won on the first ballot and served as the first speaker from Atlantic Canada in almost a hundred years. In December 2019, he ran for re-election for Speaker of the Commons but lost to fellow Liberal MP Anthony Rota. Following Rota's win, the Conservatives said that he had them to thank for his new position. They had made the decision during a caucus meeting to unseat Regan as a show of strength to the Liberal minority government.

On March 31, 2021, Regan announced that he would not seek re-election.

Awards and Honours 
 Metro Food Bank Society Community Leadership Award (1992)
 Halifax Board of Trade Certificate of Merit (1992)
 Queen Elizabeth II Golden Jubilee Medal (2002)
 Appointed member of the Queen’s Privy Council for Canada (2003)
 Elisabeth Mann Borgese Medal (2005) The International Ocean Institute awarded Regan then Minister of Fisheries and Oceans for his "exemplary leadership in the field of Ocean Governance."
 Lebanese Community Recognition Award (2008)
 Queen Elizabeth II Diamond Jubilee Medal (2012)
 Queen Elizabeth II Platinum Jubilee Medal (2022)

Personal life 
Regan's wife, Kelly Regan, is a provincial MLA and former Deputy Premier of Nova Scotia.

Electoral record

References

External links

 
 

1959 births
Canadian people of Irish descent
Dalhousie University alumni
Living people
Members of the 27th Canadian Ministry
Members of the House of Commons of Canada from Nova Scotia
Members of the King's Privy Council for Canada
Liberal Party of Canada MPs
People from Windsor, Nova Scotia
Geoff
St. Francis Xavier University alumni
Speakers of the House of Commons of Canada